The 1994 British Formula Two Championship was the sixth season of the British Formula 3000 Championship. José Luis Di Palma won the championship, driving a Reynard 92D for Madgwick International. Both the Argentinian and series runner-up Phil Andrews (Apache Racing) won two rounds apiece. However, the grids were weak and British F2 was in decline. International F3000 drivers Gareth Rees and Christian Pescatori both won one-off races with Durango, at Snetterton and Donington respectively. Future Indy Lights star Philipp Peter also had a single race with the Italian team. Rees' future team-mate Stephen Watson made a single appearance in the series. The Moosehead Grand Prix at Halifax, Canada, a non-championship F3000 race in 1993, counted as a British F2 round in 1994 and was won by the Italian-Mexican Gianfranco Cané, driving for Fred Goddard Racing.

Drivers and teams
The following drivers and teams contested the 1994 British Formula Two Championship.

Results

British Formula Two Championship

Championship Standings

References

Formula 3000
British Formula 3000 Championship